Clarence Island may refer to:

Clarence Island (South Shetland Islands), Antarctica
Clarence Island, Chile
Clarence Islands, Nunavut, Canada